Frank James O'Hora nicknamed Red is a former American baseball coach and player. He played college baseball for Penn State for coach Joe Bedenk from 1934 to 1936 before playing professionally from 1938. He then served as the head baseball coach of the Colgate Red Raiders from 1950 to 1972, leading the Red Raiders to a fourth-place finish in the 1955 College World Series.

O'Hora served as the head football coach of Bangor High School and Easton Area High School. On June 1, 1949, O'Hora was named the successor to Eppie Barnes as the head baseball coach of the Colgate Red Raiders.

Head coaching record

References

External links
 Colgate Raiders Hall of Fame
 

Year of birth missing
Year of death missing
Colgate Raiders baseball coaches
Colgate Raiders football coaches
Penn State Nittany Lions baseball players
Penn State Nittany Lions football players
Trenton Senators players
High school football coaches in Pennsylvania